Battle for Haditha is a 2007 drama film directed by British director Nick Broomfield based on the Haditha killings. Dramatising real events using a documentary style, Battle for Haditha is Broomfield's follow up to Ghosts. The film was aired on Channel 4 in the UK on 17 March 2008.

Plot
The film is inspired by the Haditha killings incident that occurred three months after the Battle of Haditha in the Iraq War. On 19 November 2005 in Haditha, a city in the western Iraqi province of Al Anbar, 24 unarmed Iraqi men, women, and children were killed by a group of United States Marines following an incident where an I.E.D killed one Marine and seriously wounded two others. Since the release of the film, the US military controversially dropped all charges to all Marines involved. The names of the Marines have been changed in the film, while the Iraqi civilians retain their real names.

Production
Shot in Jerash, Jordan, the film uses former US Military personnel and Iraqi refugees to play many of the roles. However, the film was shot in an unconventional way – it was shot sequentially enabling the cast to build their characters as the story progressed. It also used real locations, and a very small documentary style film crew. This greatly added to the feeling of reality. Actors, while working from a detailed script, and the final form of the film reflects that structure, were also able to improvise and add to the dialogue, making it their own.

Cast
The film features:
 Elliot Ruiz as Cpl Ramirez, a Marine who loses his composure after watching a friend die
 Andrew McLaren as Captain Sampson, the tough company commander in Charge of Cpl Ramirez
 Jase Willette as PFC Cuthbert, the young Marine whose death sets off the chain of events
 Yasmine Hanani as Hiba, a young Iraqi woman stuck in the middle of the chaos
 Eric Mehalacopoulos as the no-nonsense Sgt Ross
 Nathan Delacruz a former United States Marine plays Cpl Marcus with his infamous comical one liners
 Falah Flayla as a former Iraqi Army officer turned insurgent
 Thomas Hennessy Jr. as a Navy corpsman assigned to Kilo company

Film festivals
Battle for Haditha was presented at the Toronto Film Festival on 11 September 2007. Director Nick Broomfield won the Silver Shell award for Best Director at the San Sebastian Film Festival on 29 September 2007. It was also presented at the London Film Festival on 30 October 2007.

Critical reception
Metacritic reported the film had an average score of 65 out of 100, based on 12 reviews.

See also
Cinema of Jordan

References

External links

Defend Our Marines interview with Elliot Ruiz

2007 films
2007 drama films
British war drama films
2000s English-language films
2000s Arabic-language films
Iraq War films
Iraq War in fiction
War films based on actual events
Films set in Iraq
Films directed by Nick Broomfield
Films about the United States Marine Corps
2007 multilingual films
British multilingual films
2000s British films